Nieuweschoot is a village in Heerenveen in the province of Friesland, the Netherlands. It had a population of around 185 in January 2017.

History
The village was first mentioned in 1408 as Nye Schoten, and means corner of higher ground. Nieuw (new) has been added to distinguish between Oudeschoot. The Dutch Reformed church of the village date from the 14th century. In 1840, Nieuweschoot was home to 164 people.

Before 1934, Nieuweschoot was part of the Schoterland municipality.

Gallery

References

External links

Populated places in Friesland
Heerenveen